The 2019–20 UEFA Women's Champions League qualifying round was played between 7 and 13 August 2019. A total of 40 teams competed in the qualifying round to decide 10 of the 32 places in the knockout phase of the 2019–20 UEFA Women's Champions League.

Draw
The draw of the qualifying round was held at the UEFA headquarters in Nyon, Switzerland on 21 June 2019, 13:30 CEST. The 40 teams were allocated into four seeding positions based on their UEFA women's club coefficients at the beginning of the season. They were drawn into ten groups of four containing one team from each of the four seeding positions. First, the ten teams which were pre-selected as hosts were drawn from their own designated pot and allocated to their respective group as per their seeding positions. Next, the remaining 30 teams were drawn from their respective pot which are allocated according to their seeding positions.

Based on the decision taken by the UEFA Emergency Panel at its meeting in Paris on 9 June 2016, teams from Serbia or Bosnia and Herzegovina would not be drawn against teams from Kosovo.

Below are the 40 teams which participated in the qualifying round (with their 2019 UEFA women's club coefficients, which take into account their performance in European competitions from 2014–15 to 2018–19 plus 33% of their association coefficient from the same time span), with the ten teams which are pre-selected as hosts marked by (H).

Format
In each group, teams played against each other in a round-robin mini-tournament at the pre-selected hosts. The ten group winners advanced to the round of 32 to join the 22 teams which received a bye.

Tiebreakers
Teams are ranked according to points (3 points for a win, 1 point for a draw, 0 points for a loss), and if tied on points, the following tiebreaking criteria are applied, in the order given, to determine the rankings (Regulations Articles 15.01 and 15.02):
Points in head-to-head matches among tied teams;
Goal difference in head-to-head matches among tied teams;
Goals scored in head-to-head matches among tied teams;
If more than two teams are tied, and after applying all head-to-head criteria above, a subset of teams are still tied, all head-to-head criteria above are reapplied exclusively to this subset of teams;
Goal difference in all group matches;
Goals scored in all group matches;
Penalty shoot-out if only two teams have the same number of points, and they met in the last round of the group and are tied after applying all criteria above (not used if more than two teams have the same number of points, or if their rankings are not relevant for qualification for the next stage);
Disciplinary points (red card = 3 points, yellow card = 1 point, expulsion for two yellow cards in one match = 3 points);
UEFA club coefficient.

Groups
The matches were played on 7, 10 and 13 August 2019. In each group, the schedule was as follows (Regulations Article 20.04):

Times are CEST (UTC+2), as listed by UEFA (local times, if different, are in parentheses).

Group 1

Group 2

Group 3

Group 4

Group 5

Group 6

Group 7

Group 8

Group 9

Group 10

References

External links

UEFA Women's Champions League Matches: 2019–20 Qualifying, UEFA.com

1
August 2019 sports events in Europe